German submarine U-144 was a Type IID U-boat of Nazi Germany's Kriegsmarine during World War II. She was laid down on 10 January 1940 by Deutsche Werke of Kiel and commissioned on 2 October 1940.

Design
German Type IID submarines were enlarged versions of the original Type IIs. U-144 had a displacement of  when at the surface and  while submerged. She had two shafts and two  propellers.

U-144 was fitted with three  torpedo tubes at the bow, five torpedoes or up to twelve Type A torpedo mines, and a  anti-aircraft gun. The boat had a complement of 25.

Service history
In three patrols, U-144 sank one submarine for a total of 206 tons. The Soviet submarine  was torpedoed and sunk, west of Windawa/Windau (Ventspils) in position  on 23 June 1941.

Fate
U-144 was sunk on 10 August 1941 in the Gulf of Finland north of Hiiumaa, in approximate position , by torpedoes from the Soviet submarine ShCh-307. All 28 men inside were killed.

Summary of raiding history

References

Notes

Citations

Bibliography

External links

German Type II submarines
U-boats commissioned in 1940
U-boats sunk in 1941
World War II submarines of Germany
World War II shipwrecks in the Baltic Sea
1940 ships
Ships built in Kiel
U-boats sunk by Soviet submarines
Shipwrecks in the Gulf of Finland
Ships lost with all hands
Maritime incidents in August 1941